The Bujanov Tunnel is the longest double track railway tunnel in Slovakia, on the Margecany-Košice route. It was opened in 1955.

External links
 Bujanovský tunel 

Railway tunnels in Slovakia
Tunnels completed in 1955
1955 establishments in Czechoslovakia